Åke Dahlqvist (1901–1991) was a Swedish cinematographer who worked on around a hundred films during his career.

Selected filmography

 Ingmar's Inheritance (1925)
 The Red Day (1931)
 Skipper's Love (1931)
 Colourful Pages (1931)
 Tired Theodore (1931)
 Dante's Mysteries (1931)
 Servant's Entrance (1932)
 His Life's Match (1932)
 Black Roses (1932)
 Lucky Devils (1932)
 Dear Relatives (1933)
 Andersson's Kalle (1934)
 The Marriage Game (1935)
 The Family Secret (1936)
 Intermezzo (1936)
 Russian Flu (1937)
 John Ericsson, Victor of Hampton Roads (1937)
 Dollar (1938)
 A Woman's Face (1938)
 June Nights (1940)
 We're All Errand Boys (1941)
 The Fight Continues (1941)
 Tonight or Never (1941)
 Ride Tonight! (1942)
 There's a Fire Burning (1943)
 Dolly Takes a Chance (1944)
 The Invisible Wall (1944)
 The Gallows Man (1945)
 Johansson and Vestman (1946)
 Affairs of a Model (1946)
 Kristin Commands (1946)
 Woman Without a Face (1947)
 How to Love (1947)
 Eva (1948)
 I Am with You (1948)
 The Swedish Horseman (1949)
 Love Wins Out (1949)
 Woman in White (1949)
 The Quartet That Split Up (1950)
 Fiancée for Hire (1950)
 The Kiss on the Cruise (1950)
 Beef and the Banana (1951)
 Love (1952)
 Defiance (1952)
 No Man's Woman (1953)
 The Glass Mountain (1953)
 The Light from Lund (1955)
 Violence (1955)
 The Staffan Stolle Story (1956)
Seventh Heaven (1956)
 The Song of the Scarlet Flower (1956)
 Night Light (1957)
 A Goat in the Garden (1958)
 Summer and Sinners (1960)

References

Bibliography
 Chandler, Charlotte. Ingrid: Ingrid Bergman, A Personal Biography. Simon and Schuster, 2007.

External links

1901 births
1991 deaths
Swedish cinematographers